The Bet Collector (stylized ) is a 2006 Filipino drama film that centers on an aging bet collector finds her mundane existence suddenly transformed by an unforeseen series of events and jueteng, the game of numbers dating back to the Philippines' Spanish colonial period from (1521 to 1898).

Plot

An ordinary meaningless existence can suddenly be challenged by the perplexing game of life, luck and death.

Amelita or Amy is an aging jueteng kubrador (bet collector). Despite the regular crackdown on the illegal numbers game, she clings to the job she has known for more than 20 years. She walks around the poverty-stricken squatter's neighborhood collecting bets from her regular patrons every day. Her husband Eli, who is equally aging, can only manage to help by manning their small sari-sari (variety store). Amy's grown up children have all left home. Her eldest daughter Mona works as a domestic helper abroad. Her second daughter, Juvy, who is always pregnant, lives with her in-laws. Amy's youngest son, Eric, a young soldier, recently died on combat duty in Mindanao.

While collecting bets three days before All Saints day, Amy is apprehended by a police officer. She joins the other kubradors in the police station until their kabo (handler) bails them out.

The following morning, Amy returns to the streets and continues her clandestine activity. She meets the parish priest, who informs her of a young neighbor's sudden death from an accident. The priest asks her to collect abuloy (donations) from neighbors and friends.

When Amy remits her afternoon jueteng collection to her kabo, she finds him sick at home. He then asks her to attend the next jueteng draw on his behalf, Amy being a trusted ally of the jueteng network for a long time.

Amy and the other kabos await the arrival of the table manager (supervisor) of the draw in a secluded location. But when the table manager arrives, he announces that the draw is cancelled and informs everyone the winning numbers from the jueteng financier.

When Amy goes home that night, her husband Eli tells her the bad news. He failed to hand over a bet from a neighbor whose numbers, to Amy's surprise, won the rigged draw. Pissed off, she has no choice but to go to her kabo and borrow money in order to pay out the neighbor. That night, the neighbors have lighted candles in front of their houses to welcome the feast of All Saints Day the next morning.

A mammoth crowd greets Amy and her family as they approach the cemetery. At Eric's grave they saw Glenda, Eric's girlfriend, offering flowers and prayers for her dead boyfriend. Still pissed off with Eli, Amy leaves and wanders around the cemetery to cool off. Suddenly she hears a commotion. Two vehicles figured in a collision. The two drivers engage in a heated argument until one of them pulls out a gun and fires a shot. The bullet goes pass Amy and hits a teenage boy behind her. Amy shouts for help. Police arrive and arrest the suspect. Other bystanders help load the bloodied body of the boy in a vehicle. Still in a state of shock, Amy follows gaze as the vehicle speeds away from the crime scene.

Cast
Gina Pareño as Amy
Fonz Deza as Eli
Nanding Josef as Father Buboy
Teresa Jamias as Juvy
Ran Del Rosario as Eric
Soliman Cruz as the Chief of Police
Johnny Manahan as Mang Poldo
Domingo Landicho as Tatay Nick
Nico Antonio as Baste

Awards and nominations
Cinemanila International Film Festival
LINO BROCKA AWARD (Grand Prize)
28th Moscow International Film Festival 2006
FIPRESCI (International Critic's Award)
Brisbane International Film Festival 2007
NETPAC Award
Osian's Cinefan Festival of Asian and Arab Cinema 
FIPRESCI (International Critic's Award)
Best Actress for Gina Pareño
Best Film
2007 Bangkok International Film Festival
Nominee - Best ASEAN film
2007 Gawad Urian
Best Film
Best Director
Best Actress - Gina Pareño
Best Cinematography
Best Production Design
2010 Gawad Urian
Best Filipino Film of the Decade

References

External links
 

2006 films
2006 drama films
2000s Tagalog-language films
Philippine drama films
Films directed by Jeffrey Jeturian